The Leeds may refer to:
 Leeds Permanent Building Society
Leeds International Piano Competition

See also
Leeds (disambiguation)